Branko Baletić (born 5 June 1946 in Belgrade, Serbia) is a Montenegrin film director and producer.
 
His films include Granica (1990) (producer), Stela (1990) (executive producer), and his most celebrated, Balkan Express (1983), a comic tale of Serbian bootleggers and thieves during the German occupation in WW2, which remains a milestone of Serbian cinema.

Filmography

2007: Balkan ekspres 3 (director)
2005: Imam nesto vazno da vam kazem (producer)
1997: Tri letnja dana Vozac autobusa aka Three Summer Days (actor) 
1995: "Otvorena vrata" Cekajuci Batu, one episode (director) 
1990: Granica (producer) 
1990: Stela (executive producer) 
1989: Najbolji (executive producer) 
1989: Hamburg Altona (executive producer) 
1988: Klopka (executive producer) 
1988: Zivot sa stricem aka My Uncle's Legacy (executive producer) 
1987: Dogodilo se na danasnji dan aka It Happened on This Very Day, English title (producer) 
1987: Uvek spremne zene (director) 
1987: Uvek spremne zene (writer)
1986: Nanule aka Zivjeti se mora, a Croatian title for television (supervising producer) 
1983: Balkan ekspres aka Balkan Express (director) 
1983: Kamiondzije 2 television series (second unit director)
1981: Sok od sljiva (director) 
1981: Sok od sljiva (writer) 
1977: Specijalno vaspitanje aka Special Education, English title 
1969: Drzi bure vodu dok majstori odu Television Series (director) 
1969: Laka lova Television Series (director)

External links

1946 births
Living people
Film people from Belgrade
Serbian film producers
Serbian film directors
Montenegrin film directors